The 1990 AFL Foster's Cup was the Australian Football League pre-season cup competition played in its entirety before the 1990 season began.

Games

1st Round

|- bgcolor="#CCCCFF"
| Home team
| Home team score
| Away team
| Away team score
| Ground
| Crowd
| Date
|- bgcolor="#FFFFFF"
| Footscray
| 10.15 (75)
| Richmond
| 8.6 (54)
| Waverley Park
| 16,968
| Wednesday, 7 February
|- bgcolor="#FFFFFF"
| Essendon
| 5.11 (41)
|  West Coast
| 4.14 (38)
| Waverley Park
| 6,988
| Saturday, 10 February
|- bgcolor="#FFFFFF"
| Fitzroy
| 12.13 (85)
| St Kilda
| 9.13 (67)
| Waverley Park
| 12,656
| Wednesday, 14 February
|- bgcolor="#FFFFFF"
| Carlton
| 17.7 (109)
| Collingwood
| 12.10 (82)
| Waverley Park
| 41,185
| Saturday, 17 February
|- bgcolor="#FFFFFF"
| North Melbourne
| 10.8 (68)
| West Coast1
| 8.18 (66)
| Waverley Park
| 4,554
| Wednesday, 21 February
|- bgcolor="#FFFFFF"
| Sydney
| 16.9 (105)
| Hawthorn
| 13.17 (95)
| Bruce Stadium
| 12,314
| Sunday, 25 February

1 West Coast replaced Brisbane, who were forced to withdraw due to financial problems and a player's strike.

Quarter-finals

|- bgcolor="#CCCCFF"
| Home team
| Home team score
| Away team
| Away team score
| Ground
| Crowd
| Date
|- bgcolor="#FFFFFF"
|  Footscray
| 8.8 (56)
| Melbourne
| 12.13 (85)
| Waverley Park
| 15,010
| Saturday, 24 February
|- bgcolor="#FFFFFF"
| Essendon
| 7.10 (52)
|  Fitzroy
| 7.4 (46)
| Waverley Park
| 8,144
| Wednesday, 28 February
|- bgcolor="#FFFFFF"
| Carlton
| 9.13 (67)
| Sydney
| 9.12 (66)
| Waverley Park
| 14,613
| Saturday, 3 March
|- bgcolor="#FFFFFF"
| Geelong
| 12.8 (80)
| North Melbourne
| 20.20 (140)
| Waverley Park
| 10,123
| Sunday, 4 March

Semi-finals

|- bgcolor="#CCCCFF"
| Home team
| Home team score
| Away team
| Away team score
| Ground
| Crowd
| Date
|- bgcolor="#FFFFFF"
| Essendon
| 14.12 (96)
| Melbourne
| 6.13 (49)
| Waverley Park
| 13,383
| Wednesday, 7 March
|- bgcolor="#FFFFFF"
| Carlton
| 9.16 (70)
| North Melbourne
| 14.14 (98)
| Waverley Park
| 12,449
| Saturday, 10 March

Final

|- bgcolor="#CCCCFF"
| Home team
| Home team score
| Away team
| Away team score
| Ground
| Crowd
| Date
|- bgcolor="#FFFFFF"
| Essendon
| 17.10 (112)
| North Melbourne
| 10.16 (76)
| Waverley Park
| 48,559
| Saturday, 17 March

See also

List of Australian Football League night premiers
1990 AFL season

References

Australian Football League pre-season competition
Fosters Cup, 1990